Volkmar Andreae (5 July 1879 – 18 June 1962) was a Swiss conductor and composer.

Life and career 
Andreae was born in Bern. He received piano instruction as a child and his first lessons in composition with Karl Munzinger. From 1897 to 1900, he studied at the Cologne Conservatory and was a student of Fritz Brun, Franz Wüllner, Isidor Seiss and Friedrich Wilhelm Franke. In 1900 he was a soloist tutor at the Munich Hofoper.

From 1906 to 1949, he led the Tonhalle-Orchester Zürich; and from 1914 to 1939, the Conservatory of Zurich. (He was offered the opportunity of succeeding Gustav Mahler as conductor of the New York Philharmonic Orchestra in 1911, but he declined.) Later he worked as freelance composer in Vienna and worked internationally as a conductor (especially with the works of Anton Bruckner). He composed opera, symphony and chamber music, piano, violin, and oboe concertos, piano music, as well as choir music and songs.  He died in Zurich.

He is mentioned in Chapter XXI of Thomas Mann's novel Doctor Faustus, where he is cited as conducting the Thirteen Brentano Lieder by the fictional composer Adrian Leverkühn. This fictional concert is said to have taken place in 1922 in the Tonhalle in Zurich.

His grandson is the conductor , who recorded various of his grandfather's works for the Guild label.

Works (selection)

Operas
Ratcliff, opera (1914)
Abenteuer des Casanova, opera (1924)

Orchestra
 Symphony in B flat major (unpublished, WoO)
 Symphony No. 1 in F major (1900; recorded)
 Symphony No. 2 in C major, Op. 31 (1920; recorded)
 Sinfonische Fantasie, Op. 7
 Kleine Suite, Op. 27 (recorded)
 Notturno und Scherzo, Op. 30 (1919; recorded)
 Music for Orchestra, Op. 35 (1921; recorded)
 Li-Tai-Pe, Eight Chinese songs for tenor and orchestra, Op. 37 (recorded)
 La cité sur la montagne, festival music (1942)

Concertante works
 Piano Concerto in D (1898; recorded)
 Konzertstück in B minor for piano and orchestra (1900; recorded)
 Rhapsody for violin and orchestra, Op. 32 (1920; recorded)
 Violin concerto, Op. 40 (1935; recorded)
 Concertino for Oboe and Orchestra, Op. 42 (recorded)

Choral works
Vater unser for mezzo-soprano, women's choir and organ
Das Göttliche for tenor, choir and orchestra (1900)
Charons Nachen for soloists, choir, and orchestra (1901)
Schutzgeister, cantata (1904)
Li-Tai-Pe, Eight Chinese songs for tenor and orchestra (1931; recorded) – inspired by the 8th-century poet Li Tai-peh (Li Taibai, aka Li Bai)

Chamber music
 Piano Trio No. 1 in F minor, Op. 1 (recorded)
 Violin Sonata in D major, Op. 4
 String Quartet No. 1 in B-flat major, Op. 9 (recorded)
 Piano Trio No. 2 in E-flat major, Op. 14 (recorded)
 Six piano pieces for two hands, Op. 20
 String Trio in D minor, Op. 29
 Notturno and Scherzo, Op. 30
 String Quartet No. 2, Op. 33 (recorded)
 Quartet for Flute, Violin, Viola and Violoncello, Op. 43 (recorded)

References

External links
Volkmar Andreae sound-bites from chamber music works and short bio

1879 births
1962 deaths
Swiss composers
Swiss male composers
Swiss conductors (music)
Male conductors (music)
People from Bern
Academic staff of the Zurich University of the Arts